Youssef Hocine (born 7 August 1965) is a French fencer. He competed in the team foil events at the 1988 and 1992 Summer Olympics.

References

External links
 

1965 births
Living people
French male foil fencers
Olympic fencers of France
Fencers at the 1988 Summer Olympics
Fencers at the 1992 Summer Olympics
Sportspeople from Melun
20th-century French people
21st-century French people